Mount Sion Primary School is a school in Waterford City, Ireland, founded by Edmund Ignatius Rice in 1802. The school is Edmund Rice's premier school, being the focus point of study in many other Christian Brother schools. The school site is an international visitor centre as it is the site where the Christian Brothers and Presentation Brothers began their mission over 200 years ago.

Congregation of Christian Brothers schools in the Republic of Ireland
1802 establishments in Ireland
Educational institutions established in 1802
Catholic primary schools in the Republic of Ireland